Elmslie is a surname. Notable people with the surname include:

Brittany Elmslie (born 1994), Australian swimmer
George Elmslie (Australian politician) (1861–1918), Australian politician
George Grant Elmslie (1869–1952), American architect
Kenward Elmslie (born 1929), American writer and poet

See also
Purcell & Elmslie, an American architectural practice
Elmslie School, a defunct school in Blackpool, Lancashire, England
Emslie, a similar surname